At the 1936 Winter Olympics, two bobsleigh events were contested. The competitions were held from February 11, 1936, to February 15, 1936.

Medal summary

Participating nations
Liechtenstein, Luxembourg, and the Netherlands only competed in the two-man event. Twenty-three bobsledders competed in both events.

A total of 95 bobsledders from 13 nations competed at the Garmisch-Partenkirchen Games:

Medal table

References

External links
1936 bobsleigh two-man results
1936 bobsleigh four-man results
1936 Olympic Winter Games official report. - pp. 408–19.

 
1936 Winter Olympics
1936 Winter Olympics events
Olympics
Bobsleigh in Germany